James George Arbuthnot  (31 December 1883 in Nebraska – 2 December 1964 in Placer, California) was the head college wrestling coach of the Oregon State Beavers wrestling team at Oregon State University from 1911–1917 and in 1920. In eight seasons of coaching at OSU, he compiled a 10-3-3 dual meet record and won 5 conference championships. He was a welterweight.

He was the athletic director 1906 - 1910.

References

1883 births
1964 deaths
American wrestling coaches
Oregon State Beavers wrestling coaches
Oregon State Beavers athletic directors